Gamaselliphis is a genus of mites in the family Ologamasidae. There are about five described species in Gamaselliphis.

Species
These five species belong to the genus Gamaselliphis:
 Gamaselliphis cathkini (Ryke, 1961)
 Gamaselliphis grahamstowni (Ryke, 1961)
 Gamaselliphis lawrencei (Ryke, 1961)
 Gamaselliphis montanellus (Ryke, 1961)
 Gamaselliphis potchefstroomensis (Ryke, 1961)

References

Ologamasidae